John Cullom "Red" Floyd (July 14, 1891 – July 20, 1965) was an American football and basketball player and coach. He played football at Vanderbilt University with such greats as Irby "Rabbit" Curry and Josh Cody, captaining the 1920 Vanderbilt Commodores football team. He served as the head football coach at Middle Tennessee State University (1917, 1935–1938), Auburn University (1929), and The Citadel (1930–1931), compiling a career college football record of 39–21–4. Floyd was also the head basketball coach at Vanderbilt University from 1927 to 1929 and at Middle Tennessee from 1935 to 1939, tallying a career college basketball mark of 22–53.

Coaching career
In 1917, Floyd entered his first stint as a head coach at Middle Tennessee, and had a record of 7–0. Jess Neely was a member of the 1917 team. In 1929, he coached at Auburn, and compiled an 0–4 record. This makes him the only coach in NCAA history to lose four straight games after winning his first seven. From 1930 to 1931, he coached at The Citadel, and compiled a 9–9–3 record. From 1935 to 1938, he entered his second stint as a head coach at Middle Tennessee State, where he compiled a 23–8–1 record, including a second undefeated season in 1935 at 8–0.

Floyd was the eighth head football coach at The Citadel, The Military College of South Carolina, serving for two seasons, from 1930 to 1931, and compiling a record of 9–9–3.

In August 1935, Floyd was appointed head football coach at Middle Tennessee, succeeding E. M. Waller.

Death
Floyd died on July 20, 1965, at Bedford County General Hospital in Shelbyville, Tennessee.

Head coaching record

Football

See also
 List of college football head coaches with non-consecutive tenure

Notes

References

1891 births
1965 deaths
American football halfbacks
American men's basketball players
Guards (basketball)
Auburn Tigers football coaches
Middle Tennessee Blue Raiders football coaches
Middle Tennessee Blue Raiders men's basketball coaches
Rice Owls football coaches
The Citadel Bulldogs athletic directors
The Citadel Bulldogs football coaches
Vanderbilt Commodores football coaches
Vanderbilt Commodores football players
Vanderbilt Commodores men's basketball coaches
Vanderbilt Commodores men's basketball players
All-Southern college football players
People from Murfreesboro, Tennessee
Coaches of American football from Tennessee
Players of American football from Tennessee
Basketball coaches from Tennessee
Basketball players from Tennessee